Daniel Franck (born 9 December 1974) is a Norwegian professional snowboarder. He started riding in 1991, professionally since 1993. After winning the National and Nordic championships he aimed higher and started riding world cup competitions in 1993. Daniel won his first international championship Gold at the European championships in 1995, and earned 2nd. place at the World Cup Ranking the 1995–96 season.
He won the silver medal in the men's halfpipe in the 1998 Winter Olympics in Nagano, Japan.
He also participated in the 2002 Winter Olympics in Salt Lake City, Utah. There he finished 9th. place, after riding with a concussion from a crash in his last practice run.
Daniel Franck was the first snowboarding athlete to win gold at the ESPN X-Games in Snow Summit – California – in 1997, where he also took the Silver medal in the slope style contest.

In the 1999–2000 season he won the World Championships, European Championships and the World Cup overall, all in one year. A record that still stands today.
Daniel Franck, has earned 16 world cup wins, 11 Championship medals and more than 40 international podiums in his career. He is also known as "The Slippery Hotdog" because of his effortless style and ghost-like disappearance. Franck was in a computer game known as XGames Pro Boarder and Transworld Snowboarding.

Daniel Franck is still riding, but retired from the competition scene in 2008. He now runs his own clothing company which carries his name. They launched in 2009 with 34 pieces, and is working their way up in the fashion and sports market.
He is mentioned in the Mack Dawg Productions, Double Decade as one
of the most progressive riders of all time. He can be seen in the following productions: "Upping The Ante", "Melt Down Project", TB2 & TB3 (Standard Films), "Technical Difficulties", "Stomping Grounds" and many more.

References 
 FIS-Ski.com  – FIS Competition Results
 Daniel Francks Online Store (Norwegian)

1974 births
Living people
Norwegian male snowboarders
Olympic snowboarders of Norway
Snowboarders at the 1998 Winter Olympics
Snowboarders at the 2002 Winter Olympics
Snowboarders at the 2006 Winter Olympics
Olympic medalists in snowboarding
Medalists at the 1998 Winter Olympics
Olympic silver medalists for Norway